Mei Chin (born 1977) is a fiction and food writer living in Dublin.

Her short stories have appeared in Fiction and Bomb magazines and are characterized by a combination of the fantastic and the mundane.

In the late 1990s she was an editor at Vogue, and she has written reviews and essays for Gourmet, Vogue, Mirabella, The New York Times Book Review, and other publications. She is also the author of a number of books of literary criticism for Chelsea House Publishers, and she has taught food writing at Yale University. Her essays have been anthologized in Best Food Writing 2004, 2006, and 2012.

She is a native of Connecticut and a graduate of Hopkins School and Wesleyan University. Her mother, Professor Annping Chin teaches at Yale, and her stepfather, Professor Jonathan Spence, taught there until he retired in 2008.

Awards
She won the James Beard Foundation's M. F. K. Fisher Distinguished Writing Award in 2005 for "Eat Drink Mother Daughter," (a long article published in Saveur) and won an IACP Food Journalism Award in 2010 for her Saveur article "The Art of Kimchi."

References

External links

 Baste The Book (Chin's personal web site)

1977 births
Living people
Writers from Connecticut
American writers of Chinese descent
Chinese women writers
21st-century American women writers
Wesleyan University alumni
Hopkins School alumni
American people of Manchu descent
American food writers
Women food writers
American emigrants to Ireland